999: What's Your Emergency? is a British television documentary. Broadcast on Channel 4, the show provides insight into modern Britain through the eyes of the emergency services, using a mixture of fly-on-the-wall footage taken at incidents and retrospective interviews with the people and staff featured. The show is narrated by Hugo Speer, with the exception of Series 2 which was narrated by Julian Barratt.
  
Series 1 followed police officers, paramedics, firefighters, and call handlers in Blackpool, Lancashire. Series 2 followed paramedics throughout the UK. Series 3 followed police officers, paramedics, and call handlers in Cheshire. From Series 4 to Series 11, the show followed police officers, paramedics, call handlers, and occasionally firefighters in Wiltshire and Northamptonshire. Series 12 onwards has followed police officers and call handlers in South Yorkshire and Northamptonshire police.

Episodes
All episode ratings are taken from the BARB website and include Channel 4 and Channel 4+1.

Series 1 (2012)

Series 2 (2013)

Series 3 (2016-17)

Series 4 (2017)

Series 5 (2017)

Series 6 (2018)

Series 7 (2018)

Series 8 (2018)

Series 9 (2019)

Series 10 (2020)

Series 11 (2020)

Series 12 (2021)

Series 13 (2021)

Series 14 (2022)

Controversies
After Series 1 of the show, residents and councillors from Blackpool expressed their dismay at how their town was portrayed to potential visitors, and were concerned the gritty reality may discourage tourism. In particular, the leader of Blackpool council Simon Blackburn voiced his concerns after watching the show. On 26 July 2013, it was confirmed that Crackit Productions and the BBC were about to commission "Holiday Hospital 999", another show portraying Blackpool, but these plans were shelved. After the effect of "999: What's Your Emergency?" on the town's popularity with tourists, the Blackpool Gazette called this a "bullet dodged".

PC Claire van Deurs Goss was disciplined by Lancashire Constabulary after being shown applying lip gloss at the wheel of a police vehicle in Series 1 Episode 6, an action which prompted over 50 complaints to the force.

Despite praising the overall performance of his staff, Wiltshire Police Chief Constable Kier Pritchard admitted that the expletives used by some of the Wiltshire police officers featured in the show fell below the standards expected of them.

References

External links
 
 999: What's Your Emergency? at Channel4.com

2012 British television series debuts
2010s British documentary television series
2010s British medical television series
2020s British documentary television series
2020s British medical television series
Blackpool
Channel 4 documentary series
English-language television shows
Television shows set in Cheshire
Television shows set in Lancashire
Television shows set in Wiltshire